Brachycythara barbarae, common name Barbara's top spindle, is a species of sea snail, a marine gastropod mollusk in the family Mangeliidae.

Description
The length of the shell attains 3.5 mm.

Distribution
B. barbarae can be found in Atlantic waters, ranging from the coast of North Carolina south to Brazil, and in the Gulf of Mexico. at depths up to 103 m.

References

 Lyons, William G. "New Turridae (Gastropoda: Toxoglossa) from south Florida and the eastern Gulf of Mexico." The Nautilus 86.1 (1972): 3–7.
 Rolán E. & Espinosa J. (1999). El complejo Brachycythara biconica (C. B. Adams, 1850) (Mollusca: Gastropoda: Turridae) en Cuba, con la descripción de una nueva especie. Bollettino Malacologico, 34(1-4): 43-49
  Rosenberg, G., F. Moretzsohn, and E. F. García. 2009. Gastropoda (Mollusca) of the Gulf of Mexico, Pp. 579–699 in Felder, D.L. and D.K. Camp (eds.), Gulf of Mexico–Origins, Waters, and Biota. Biodiversity. Texas A&M Press, College Station, Texas

External links
  Tucker, J.K. 2004 Catalog of recent and fossil turrids (Mollusca: Gastropoda). Zootaxa 682:1-1295.
 

barbarae
Gastropods described in 1972